The Israeli Infantry Corps is a corps in the Israel Defense Forces. It is a maneuvering corps which primarily relies on infantry troops. It includes several regular and reserve service units and brigades which are operationally commanded by the IDF's regional commands.

Overview
The corps moves to the battlefield either on foot, on jeeps, or on armoured personnel carriers. Since the corps is based on soldiers who fight on foot, most of the weapons employed are personal or crew-served weapons.

Weapons

The personal weapon of most IDF soldiers is the IWI Tavor X-95 "Micro-Tavor", and M4A1 assault rifle. The majority of regular-service Infantry Corps soldiers are equipped with the Tavor X-95 assault rifle. In 2005, the IMI Tavor Commando assault rifle was brought to operational use, and is currently the corps' principal assault rifle. Every soldier in operational service is also equipped with various hand grenades.

The company and platoon weapons are diverse, and include the IMI Negev and the Fabrique Nationale MAG machine guns. Heavier weapons include the Browning M2 and the General Dynamics Mk 19 grenade launcher.  Various units also use designated marksmen and snipers who rely on the M16A2E3, the SR-25 semi-automatic sniper rifle, the Remington M24 Sniper Weapon System, the Barrett M82A1, and recently the H-S Precision Pro Series 2000 HTR "Barak 338".

Missiles and rockets
To engage armored targets, the corps uses a variety of grenades, rockets, and missiles. The corps units are equipped with Anti-tank RPGs such as the RPG-7, the M72 LAW, and B-300 Shoulder-Launched Multipurpose Assault Weapon. Recently, Rafael Advanced Defense Systems MATADOR anti-structures rocket was entered to service, used successfully in Operation Cast Lead. These are relatively cheap and easy to operate weapons, and are in high availability to target vehicles or buildings.

Since modern campaign tanks are heavily armoured, the designated weapon against them are Anti-tank guided missiles, which are more expensive and difficult to operate than RPGs. The corps primarily uses Tow and the Spike missiles.

Vehicles
The corps uses a variety of vehicles for transport, scouting, troop mobility, security, and command and control. The light scout and mobile vehicles are Sufa jeeps and Humvees. The former are reasonably defended but not heavily armoured as they are expected to provide utmost speed and navigability. The Humvee, on the other hand, exists in a variety of forms, some relatively heavily defended, some entirely "open." It is equipped with either a machine gun, rocket, anti tank missiles, communications equipment, sometimes including a small trailer. For transporting troops through hostile areas, the "Safari" is a converted bus equipped with heavy armor.

Under heavy fire, troops are primarily transported by APCs. Often, because of the armor offered by the APC, much of the fighting takes place with these, which are equipped with machine guns, mortars, rockets, or anti tank missiles. The IDF's principal APC is the M113, primarily those purchased from the United States during the 1970s. Despite upgrades and improvements, it is considered an old and vulnerable APC. To respond to the need for heavier APCs, the IDF adapted a variety of older or captured tanks to serve as heavy APCs, such as the Achzarit on a T-55 chassis  and the Nagmachon and Nakpadon on Centurion tank chassis. Some heavy APCs were originally combat engineering vehicles, such as the Puma, used by the Combat Engineering Corps to transport heavy engineering materials, but due to its heavy armor, sometimes used to transport troops into hostile areas.

Active brigades
 1st Golani Brigade
 35th Paratroopers Brigade
 89th Commando Brigade
 84th Givati Brigade
 900th Kfir Brigade
 933rd Nahal Brigade

Reserve brigades
 2nd "Carmeli" (Reserve) Infantry Brigade
 3rd "Alexandroni" (Reserve) Infantry Brigade
 5th "Sharon" (Reserve) Infantry Brigade
 6th "Etzioni" (Reserve) Infantry Brigade
 9th "Oded" (Reserve) Infantry Brigade
 11th "Yiftah" (Reserve) Infantry Brigade
 12th "Negev" (Reserve) Infantry Brigade
 16th "Jerusalem" (Reserve) Infantry Brigade
 55th "Hod Ha-Hanit/Tip of the Spear" (Reserve) Paratroopers Brigade
 226th (Reserve) Paratroopers Brigade
 228th (Reserve) Infantry Brigade
 551st "Hetzei Ha-Esh/Arrows of Fire" (Reserve) Paratroopers Brigade
 646th "Sky Fox" (Reserve) Paratroopers Brigade

Independent battalions
The Sword Battalion (299th), a Druze battalion (disbanded in 2015)
The  (585th), a Bedouin battalion
The Caracal Battalion (33rd), named after the Caracal cat, this is a mixed battalion that includes both male and female soldiers.

Independent units
The Oketz unit (dog handlers).

External links
Official site

Infantry
Military units and formations established in 2000